June Babies, the first album by English singer-songwriter Rebecca Hollweg, was released on 9 October 2001 on Emu Records. Consisting of melodic pop songs, it featured string arrangements by Chris Bowden and a guest appearance by Jeb Loy Nichols.  It was critically acclaimed in the British national and music press and was played on Jeremy Vine's BBC Radio 2 show. The title track was used in a BBC television programme about women runners.

Production and launch
The album was produced and recorded by Andy Hamill in London.

Reception
Dan Cairns, writing in the Culture section of The Sunday Times, praised "the title track’s ode to friendship and late developers, the bare-bones upcloseness of Where Are You Going? and the wryly observational Is It Me You’re Looking For?" and said: "there is something of [Joni] Mitchell in her soaring vocal lines and [Suzanne] Vega in her confessional ones, though there are unexpected echoes, too, of Marianne Faithfull at her throatiest".

Rob Beattie in Q magazine described her as a "gifted tunesmith, happy to wrangle words into memorable phrases ('You cannot see these bruises/They are inside my head')" and praised "Weather Song, with its infectious chorus, and the beautiful, bouncing Warhol and Williams".

Songs from the album were played on Jeremy Vine's BBC Radio 2 show. The title track was used in a BBC television programme about women runners.

Track listing
"June Babies" (3:14)
"Getting On" (3:35)
"Sorry" (2:44)
"Warhol & Williams/Playout" (4:27)
"Is It Me You're Looking For?" (3:48)
"Long Lie" (3:14)
"Dancing in the Kitchen" (3:04)
"Weather Song" (2:19)
"Have You Heard the Birds Sing in the Night?" (3:30)
"Take Me Away" (3:38)
"Where Are You Going?" (3:31)
"Existential" (3:39)
Running time: 41:46

Personnel
 Rebecca Hollweg – vocals, acoustic guitar 
 Andy Hamill – double bass, bass guitars, backing vocals
 Jeb Loy Nichols – backing vocals on "Warhol & Williams/Playout"
 Phil Peskett – piano, electric piano
 Mike Outram – guitar, backing vocals
 Mark Johns – guitar
 Tom Gordon – drums, percussion
 Chris Bowden – saxophone
 Chris Worsley – cello
 Alex Hollweg – sousaphone on "Warhol & Williams/Playout"
 Reiad Chibah – viola
 Everton Nelson – violin
 Jacqueline Norrie – violin

References

External links
 Official website: Rebecca Hollweg

2001 debut albums
Rebecca Hollweg albums